Fred Hunt may refer to:

 Fred Hunt (1917–1977), Canadian ice hockey player
 Fred Hunt (1923–1986), English jazz pianist

See also
 Frederick Vinton Hunt, known as "Ted" (1905–1972), American acoustic engineer
 Fred (name)
 Hunt (surname)